Narangpur  is a village in Phagwara tehsil in the Kapurthala district of Punjab State, India. It is administrated by a Sarpanch, an elected representative of village.

Transport
The nearest railway stations to Narangpur are Phagwara Junction and Mauli Halt. Jalandhar City railway station is 23 km away. The village is 118 km from Sri Guru Ram Dass Jee International Airport in Amritsar; and Sahnewal Airport  in Ludhiana is 40 km away. Its nearest cities are Phagwara, Jandiala, Jalandhar and Phillaur.

References

External links
  Villages in Kapurthala
 Kapurthala Villages List

Villages in Kapurthala district